Chris Jon Brayne is an Australian politician. He was a Labor Party member of the Victorian Legislative Assembly from November 2018 to November 2022, representing the seat of Nepean.

Before his election, he worked in the electricity industry, as well as holding a weekend job at the Dromana drive-in theatre.

References

Year of birth missing (living people)
Living people
Australian Labor Party members of the Parliament of Victoria
Members of the Victorian Legislative Assembly
21st-century Australian politicians